Punit Jayesh Pathak (born 1 November 1986), is an Indian dancer, choreographer and actor. In 2019, he participated in Colors TV's Fear Factor: Khatron Ke Khiladi 9 and emerged as the winner.

Personal life 
Pathak was born on 1 November 1986. Initially, he dreamt of becoming a cricketer or a filmmaker. During his college days, he developed an interest in dancing. His father was against his decision as he wanted Pathak to look after his company, Punit Yarn Agency Private Limited. There were many fights between Pathak and his father. But his younger brother sacrificed his dream of becoming a dancer and took the responsibility of the business. On 26 August 2020, Pathak got engaged to his long time girlfriend Nidhi Moony Singh and they married on 11 December 2020.

Career 
In 2009, Pathak participated in the dance reality show  Dance India Dance 2, which aired on Zee TV.

In 2013, he debuted as an actor in the 3D dance-based film ABCD: Any Body Can Dance co-starring Dharmesh Yelande, Prabhu Deva and Salman Yusuff Khan. Later, he appeared in the dance reality show Jhalak Dikhhla Jaa as a choreographer.  He was the judge of  Dance India Dance 5 on Zee TV.

In 2015, he starred in the film, ABCD 2, directed by Remo D'Souza, co-starring Varun Dhawan, Shraddha Kapoor, Prabhu Deva and Raghav Juyal. Later, he became a mentor on the dance reality show Dance Plus. He was also a choreographer in Dance Champions.

In 2018, he starred in the romantic comedy film Nawabzaade, which was released on 27 July 2018, directed by Jayesh Pradhan and produced by Lizelle D'Souza and Matur K. Barot, co-starring Raghav Juyal, Dharmesh Yelande and Isha Rikhi.

In 2019, he participated in Colors TV's stunt-based reality show Fear Factor: Khatron Ke Khiladi 9 and emerged as the winner. His team also performed in Isha Ambani's sangeet ceremony.  He also choreographed the finale performance of the IPL (2019). He was later called as a guest on Khatra Khatra Khatra.

In 2020, he appeared in the dance film Street Dancer 3D which was released on 24 January 2020, directed by Remo D'Souza, co-starring Varun Dhawan, Shraddha Kapoor, Prabhu Deva, Nora Fatehi and Raghav Juyal.

Filmography

Films

Musicals

References

External links
 
 
 

Living people
1987 births
Indian choreographers
Male actors in Hindi cinema
21st-century Indian male actors
Indian male film actors
Fear Factor: Khatron Ke Khiladi participants